Jagüey Grande, simply known as Jagüey, is a town and municipality in the Matanzas Province of Cuba. It is located east of the Zapata Peninsula, north of the Bahia de Cochinos, along the A1 motorway in the center of the province.

History
The town was founded in 1840 and was named after the tree Ficus citrifolia, locally named "Jagüey".

Geography
The municipality was historically divided into the barrios of Pueblo (town's centre), Gallardo, López, Murga Sinú and Rovira. Nowadays it counts the town itself and the popular councils (consejos populares, i.e. villages) of Agramonte, Australia, San José de Marcos and Torriente. Agramonte, the most populated village, was an autonomous municipality until the 1976 reform.

Demographics
In 2007, the municipality of Jagüey Grande had a population of 87,771.

Health

Notable people
Mario García Menocal (1866–1941), politician, 3rd President 
of Cuba
Jaime Lucas Ortega y Alamino (1936-2019), archbishop
Leopoldo Fernández (Tres Patines) (1904-1985), actor and comedian

See also
Forest siege (2010)
Municipalities of Cuba
List of cities in Cuba

References

External links

 
Cities in Cuba
Populated places in Matanzas Province
Populated places established in 1762
1762 establishments in New Spain
1760s establishments in the Spanish West Indies
1760s in Cuba